George Thomas Whitesides is an American businessman. He was CSO (Chief Space Officer) and long time CEO of Virgin Galactic, a firm developing commercial space vehicles at the Mojave Air and Space Port. He still serves as a member of the Virgin Galactic Advisory Board. He studied in Newton North High School. Whitesides was previously Chief of Staff of the National Aeronautics and Space Administration, a position to which he was named after serving on the NASA transition team for the incoming Obama administration. On February 22, 2023, he announced his candidacy for California's 27th Congressional district in the 2024 election.

Career
From 2004 to 2008, Whitesides served as the Executive Director of the National Space Society. He is the co-creator of Yuri's Night.

He has served as Senior Advisor to Virgin Galactic, Richard Branson's space tourism company.

Whitesides was the Chairman of the Reusable Launch Vehicle Working Group of COMSTAC, the advisory committee for the FAA's Commercial Space Transportation Division.  He was a board member of Astronomers Without Borders and the Space Generation Foundation.

He has served as a coach for Zero Gravity Corporation's parabolic flight service.

Whitesides announced he will be leaving Virgin Galactic to pursue public service, but will still be in an advisory position to the publicly traded company.

Early life and education
George Whitesides attended Princeton University, graduating from the Woodrow Wilson School of Public and International Affairs.  He served for four years on Princeton's Board of Trustees upon graduation.  He has an MPhil in Geographical Information Systems and Remote Sensing from King's College, Cambridge. He was a Fulbright Scholar in Tunisia.

Personal life
George is married to Loretta Hidalgo Whitesides. His father is George M. Whitesides, a professor of chemistry at Harvard University.

References

Virgin Galactic
Living people
Year of birth missing (living people)
Princeton School of Public and International Affairs alumni
NASA people
Obama administration personnel
Newton North High School alumni